The Energy Marketers of America (EMA) is a National association that represents the interests, at the Federal level, of companies and organizations that are in the business of producing and marketing energy products. Technically, EMA is a federation of 47 state and regional associations who represent small marketers at the state level whereas the Energy Marketers of America focuses on national issues and particularly Federal laws and regulations that affect independent energy marketers. It advocates for the business interests of independent energy marketers and of its member associations before Congress, regulatory agencies and other Federal Government entities.

The Energy Marketers of America used to be known as Petroleum Marketers of America (PMAA) until October 2020 when the governing board decided on the name change. The association claimed that new name better reflects the changing nature of the energy industry and the association's members, who are involved in a variety of fuel-related businesses beyond just petroleum. A petroleum marketer is an energy marketer that primarily sells fuel and heating oil products. More broadly, energy marketers also sell a wide range of energy products from newer clean biofuels to emerging alternative energy sources. According to the EMA website the association represents a "growing portfolio of affordable, efficient, and environmentally friendly liquid fuels and other alternative energy sources that are helping to reduce emissions".

The public sometimes thinks that the energy business is made up of just a few very large international companies like ExxonMobil, Chevron and ConocoPhillips and these companies are extremely important to the "upstream" sector of the energy industry. Upstream refers to the early stages of oil and gas production, including exploration, drilling, and extraction. The upstream sector of the industry is responsible for finding and producing energy reserves, and is typically divided into two main areas: offshore production and onshore production. The upstream sector of the energy industry is different from the "downstream" sector, which is focused on marketing and distributing products to consumers. EMA - and its members - are mostly marketers active in the downstream sector of the industry and most of these marketers are small, independent retailers. They operate local gasoline stations, deliver heating oil and sell a variety of related products and services often at razor thin margins.

The Energy Marketers of America is a 501(c)(6) nonprofit organization that based in Washington D.C. EMA represents its members by running an annual 'Day on The Hill' event, publishing EMA Journal and operating a Political Action Committee called The EMA Small Business Committee EMA holds its annual meeting each year at the National Association of Convenience Store's Annual Trade Show called The NACS Show.

PMOCO

In addition to representing marketers needs in Washington, D.C., PMAA holds a majority interest in PMOCO, LLC. PMOCO is a for profit LLC whose mission is to own and operate a national retailing brand called the Spirit Petroleum. Formed in 2002, Spirit Brand gasoline and convenience stores now operate coast-to-coast.

References

External links
Official website

Federations
Organizations based in Virginia